BRAVO Volunteer Ambulance is a volunteer ambulance organization which provides 24/7 emergency medical services to the neighborhoods of Bay Ridge, Fort Hamilton and Dyker Heights in Brooklyn, New York. Its area is boarded by 60th Street to the north, 14th Avenue to the east, and New York harbor to the west and south, including the Verrazano Narrows Bridge.  BRAVO an all volunteer organization, providing its services entirely for free, neither billing nor accept any funds from their patients' insurance carriers. BRAVO is supported solely by donations.

History 
Bay Ridge, at the south-western point of Brooklyn, had notoriously slow ambulance response times. Recognizing a need to improve on the nearly hour-long response for a city or hospital-based ambulance, members of the community came together to found a local team of dedicated volunteers.  Led by Community Board Chairman Hank Vogt, a handful of civic leaders, with the assistance of John Rusin, began to gather documentation from the NYS Volunteer Ambulance Association and the Board of Health to justify the need for a volunteer ambulance service in this community. Inspired by the film Rio Bravo, the name was selected to reflect the caliber of dedication needed to provide such a service.  The name is also a backronym, standing for Bay Ridge Ambulance Volunteer Organization.

With additional support from politicians, religious groups and civic associations, BRAVO was able to secure a charter and the necessary certifications to operate. The first meeting for members was held on January 24, 1974, in which BRAVO accepted 103 applications for new members. BRAVO opened its doors in a location found by Councilman Angelo J. Arculeo. On July 4, 1974, BRAVO responded to its first call, officially providing EMS to Bay Ridge. After only a month, BRAVO was able to extend service to provide ambulance coverage 24-hours per day. Call volume was so high, the organization purchased its second vehicle to increase emergency response. BRAVO boasted response times of under 5 minutes throughout the community. 

BRAVO is headquartered at 85th Street and 7th Avenue. Due to state recognition of superior service, BRAVO volunteers were selected to join New York State's new Advanced Emergency Technician program.

In 1987, the New York State Department of Health (DOH) selected BRAVO to pilot the new Emergency Medical Technician - Defibrillation program. Under these guidelines, all BRAVO units were trained and equipped with an Automatic External Defibrillator (AED). Within the year, BRAVO had its first successful resuscitation of a patient in cardiac arrest.

Current operations 
BRAVO currently operates 3 New York State Department of Health certified ambulances, designated BRAVO 1, BRAVO 2 and BRAVO 3. These ambulances are equipped beyond state protocols and are maintained by the operations department. BRAVO also has a special personnel transportation vehicle, designated BRAVO 4, which does not carry patients. It is commonly seen at special events and as a back-up vehicle. BRAVO also has several bicycles stocked with equipment to serve as bike patrol.

Membership 
BRAVO accepts applications for volunteers year-round and hosts new member interviews periodically. Potential members are interviewed by a committee of current BRAVO members and have to pass a background check. There are no prerequisites to volunteer with BRAVO, but members must be certified as an EMT-B or higher to ride on the ambulance. Non-EMT members may serve as corps dispatchers. After satisfactory experience as a dispatcher, members can apply for a New York State voucher which covers the cost of the EMT class. Mandatory orientation and training is provided by the training department to new members. Members must be over the age of 18, but do not have to reside in the areas served.

Training 
BRAVO has its own training department and classroom, which is used for both internal and external medical trainings. BRAVO offers mandatory training for its EMTs, which include knowledge in emergency dispatching, situational awareness, weapons of mass destruction, and mass-casualty incidents. BRAVO also offers its members continuing medical education courses throughout the year in a variety of topics, and aids members in retaining CPR, AED and First Aid certification. BRAVO offers courses to the community in CPR, AED and First Aid.  The Training Department is overseen by the Vice President of Operations.

Youth squad 
BRAVO has a Youth Squad available to teenagers between the ages of 14 and 18. Established in an effort to increase recruitment, the Youth Squad operates as a stepping stone and volunteer opportunity for High School students. Youth Squad members do not need any prior training and are instructed in CPR, First Aid, and vital signs. Youth Squad joins the general membership at special events, particularly holiday collections, parades and festivals. Youth Squad members are also able to take shifts as observing dispatchers and join the general membership when they turn 18. The Youth Squad is overseen by advisors and the Executive Vice President.

Leadership

Senior Officers 
 President - Anthony Napoli
 Vice President of Administration - Adam Gottlieb
 Vice President of Operations - David Aspiazu 
 Vice President of Finance -

Officers 
 Community Affairs - Amy Christodoulou
 Training Officer - Kris Nelson
 Equipment Officer - Joseph Culmine
 Director of IT- Anthony L. Paduano
 Director of Security- Danny Masterson
 Director of Human Resources - Laura Gottlieb

Board of Directors 
 John DiVeglio, Chairperson
 Phyllis Antoniello
 Pamela Carlton
 Amy Christodoulou
 Jory Guttsman
 James Koutsavlis
 Marianna Murray-O'Connor
 Anthony Napoli
 Diane Napoli
 Jim Nealon
 Dr. Lou Soloff MD
 Gene Walsh
 Anthony L. Paduano

References

External links

Ambulance services in the United States
Medical and health organizations based in New York City